This is a partial list of mosques in Europe.

Group

See also
 Lists of mosques
 Islam in Europe

References

External links
 
 A map of mosques in Europe

!Europe
Mosques